Trzcin  is a village in the administrative district of Gmina Grodziczno, within Nowe Miasto County, Warmian-Masurian Voivodeship, in northern Poland.

The village has a population of 269.

References

Trzcin